Priya Raina (born 5 November 1988) is an Indian television actress, singer, comedian, host, and voice over artist born in Kashmir, Jammu and Kashmir, India. She is best known for her comedy show on Sony TV Comedy Circus Ka Naya Daur. In 2019 she released her first Kashmiri music video "Madno" winning her accolades. In 2020 she won an award in India Voice Fest for the best female voice in Hindi Drama category. She was recently seen in popular web series ‘Rocket Boys’ on Sony Liv..

Personal life
Priya Raina was born on 5 November 1988 in Kashmir, India to Shuban Lal Raina and Rekha Raina, belonging to the generations of Kashmiri Pandits who experienced migration in their childhood. She holds a Masters Degree in English Literature and is a trained singer.

She started her career as a radio jockey with Big FM, and later participated in the reality show India's Got Talent on Colors followed by comedy circus on Sony Tv. She has also acted in various tv shows, films and commercials. She is a well known voice artist.

Filmography

Films

Television

Dubbing roles

Live action films

Foreign language films

Indian films

References

External links
 
 
 
 

Living people
21st-century Indian actresses
Indian television actresses
Actresses in Hindi television
Indian voice actresses
1988 births